Hovin Church is a parish church of the Church of Norway in Tinn Municipality in Vestfold og Telemark county, Norway. It is located in the village of Hovin. It is one of the churches for the Tinn parish which is part of the Øvre Telemark prosti (deanery) in the Diocese of Agder og Telemark. The white, wooden church was built in a long church design in 1850 using plans drawn up by the architect Hans Linstow. The church seats about 250 people.

History
The earliest existing historical records of the church date back to the year 1392, but that is not when the church was founded. The church may have been established during the 13th century. This church was also a wooden stave church. In 1729, the church was either heavily repaired and renovated. In 1844, the old building was described as being too small and uncomfortable. At that time, it was agreed that a new church should be built. The parish chose designs by Hans Linstow (a larger version of the same drawings were used for the nearby Gransherad Church). The new church was built by the builder, Halvor Andreas Olsen from Kongsberg (who also built the Gransherad Church). The new church was consecrated on 29 August 1850. This church has a tower on the west end of the nave and there is a choir on the east end with a small sacristy extension further to the east. The bell tower has a rather unique bell-shaped roof.

See also
List of churches in Agder og Telemark

References

Tinn
Churches in Vestfold og Telemark
Long churches in Norway
Wooden churches in Norway
19th-century Church of Norway church buildings
Churches completed in 1850
13th-century establishments in Norway